Hacène Benaboura (1898-1960) was an Algerian artist. He is considered to be one of the "forefathers of Algerian modern painting". In 1957 he was the recipient of Algeria's Grand Prize for Art.

Personal life
Benaboura was born in Algiers in 1898. His family was of Turkish origin.

References

External links
ArtNet: Hacène Benaboura

1898 births
1960 deaths
Algerian people of Turkish descent
Algerian artists
Turkish artists
People from Algiers
20th-century Algerian painters